Pia Gyger (born 2 November 1940 in Schaffhausen; died 14 July 2014 in Basel ) was a Swiss specialist for special education, psychologist and Zen master of the White Plum Sangha lineage. She was the co-founder of the Lassalle-Institute within the Lassalle-House in Bad Schönbrunn/Zug, Canton of Zug. She was co-initiator of the Jerusalem-Project.

Education
Gyger studied 1972–1976 special education (i.e. education, training, raising and promotion of children and young persons with development impairments and handicaps) and psychology at the Zurich University of Applied Sciences.

Zen education
In the years 1976–1999, she was educated in Zen in Kamakura, Kanagawa/Japan with Hugo Makibi Enomiya-Lassalle and Yamada Kôun Roshi in Hawaii. She received Dharma transmission from Aitken Rōshi and was also taken up in the Buddhist Peace Fellowship to co-operate in international peace projects. In 1999, she was confirmed as Zen master ("inka shōmei") by Tetsugen Bernard Glassman.

Activities
In 1969 Gyger joined the ecumenical community with inter-religious orientation Saint Katharina-Werk, Basel. On behalf of the Federal Department of Justice and Police she founded 1976 a therapy home near Horw for particularly difficult young persons which she led until 1982. Subsequently she was nominated general leader of the Saint Katharina-Werk. In 1986, she founded a project for meetings of the world’s religions and in 1989 she initiated in a slum on the outskirts of Manila a school for the spiritual and political awareness of young people. 1995, back in Switzerland, she founded together with Niklaus Brantschen the Lassalle-Institute of Zen – Ethics – Leadership which they led until 2002 and at which she is teaching. Brantschen and she founded in 2003 the Lassalle-Zen-line and the school of contemplation „Via Integralis“. After that they developed the project Jerusalem – Open town for learning of the peace in the world which is accredited at the UN and leads them regularly to Jerusalem and to New York.

Bibliography
Gyger is author of 7 books edited in German.

External links
 Website of Lassalle-Institute
 Portray of Pia Gyger
 Description of Jerusalem-Project

Footnotes 

1940 births
People from the canton of Schaffhausen
People from Schaffhausen
Zen Buddhist spiritual teachers
Catholic ecumenical and interfaith relations
Swiss writers
Roman Catholic writers
Religious writers
2014 deaths
People in interfaith dialogue